The Georgia–Carolina Memorial Bridge was a highway crossing over the Savannah River between the states of Georgia and South Carolina that was in service from 1927 to 1981. The completion of this bridge marked the beginning of the end for Savannah River ferry traffic.

History
In November 1921, the Calhoun Highway Association requested the Georgia State Highway Department to conduct surveys of the Savannah River near Calhoun Falls, South Carolina, to determine a site for a bridge. In March 1925, R. E. Toms, District 8 Engineer of Georgia, approved the Burton's Ferry site just above the homestead of James Edward Calhoun, a son of John C. Calhoun, at Millwood, South Carolina, estimated to cost at around $200,000 (equivalent to $ in ).

The federal government committed $100,000 (equivalent to $ in ) with the states of Georgia and South Carolina each committing the same amount. Elbert County, Georgia, and Abbeville County, South Carolina, each would contribute $25,000 (equivalent to $ in ) to their state's obligation.

In April 1925, Abbeville County voted for a $25,000 bridge bond, and in August, Elbert County matched the sum. In June 1925, Elbert County Commissioners were assured by the State Highway Board that the Calhoun Highway would be funded from Johnsontown, Georgia, to the bridge site on the Savannah River at Burton's Ferry. In August 1925, Searcy B. Slack offered two plans for the crossing, a steel deck truss bridge and a reinforced concrete arch bridge.

In February 1926, Emmett M. Williams of Monroe, Georgia, secured the lowest bid for the concrete arch bridge at $213,992 (equivalent to $ in ). An unnamed bridge company from Greensboro, North Carolina, was the low bidder for the steel deck truss bridge. Despite the higher cost, Abbeville County insisted on the concrete arch design. Ground was broken March 23, 1926, by James Y. Swift of Elberton.

Design and construction
The bridge was an eleven-span concrete arch design, with the symmetrical arches of two ribs and open spandrels. Two memorial tablets, bolted to the banisters, were later removed. At the time of its construction, it was one of the largest reinforced concrete bridges in the southeastern United States.

Dedication
The American Legion posts in both counties suggested that the bridge be a memorial to American soldiers who lost their lives in the Great War, and by September 1927, the span was being referred to as the Georgia–Carolina Memorial Bridge. The crossing was officially opened at a large dedication ceremony on Armistice Day 1927. Miss Ida Calhoun, lineal descendant of John C. Calhoun, broke a bottle of ginger ale over the concrete banister at the center of the bridge.

Replacement
The bridge was replaced by a new crossing in 1981.

See also
List of bridges documented by the Historic American Engineering Record in Georgia (U.S. state)
List of bridges documented by the Historic American Engineering Record in South Carolina

References

External links

Road bridges in Georgia (U.S. state)
Monuments and memorials in Georgia (U.S. state)
Bridges completed in 1927
Crossings of the Savannah River
Concrete bridges in the United States
Historic American Engineering Record in Georgia (U.S. state)
Historic American Engineering Record in South Carolina
Open-spandrel deck arch bridges in the United States
Buildings and structures in Elbert County, Georgia
Buildings and structures in Abbeville County, South Carolina
Road bridges in South Carolina
Monuments and memorials in South Carolina